Jarrah (also transliterated as Cerrah (Turkish), Djarrah, Djerrah, or Jarah) is an Arabic name, or an Australian name (i.e., the singer of the band Panama), it may refer to:

Given name
 al-Jarrah ibn Abdallah, Arab general under the Umayyads
 Jarah Al Ateeqi, Kuwaiti footballer
 Cerrah Mehmed Pasha, Ottoman statesman

Surname
 Ali al-Jarrah, Israeli spy
 Assem Jarrah, Lebanese intelligence officer
 Nouri al-Jarrah, Syrian poet
 Ziad Jarrah,  Lebanese hijacker-pilot of United Airlines Flight 93

Fictional characters
 Sayid Jarrah, a character on the television series Lost

See also
 Jarrah (disambiguation)

Arabic-language surnames
Arabic masculine given names